United Nations Security Council Resolution 10, adopted on November 4, 1946, determined that the Francoist State in Spain no longer warranted the continuous observation of the Council and turned over all related documents to the General Assembly.  It was adopted unanimously.

See also
List of United Nations Security Council Resolutions 1 to 100 (1946–1953)
United Nations Security Council Resolution 7
United Nations Security Council Resolution 4

References
Text of the Resolution at undocs.org

 0010
20th century in Spain
Francoist Spain
 0010
1946 in Spain
November 1946 events

External links